Aubrey Beauclerk may refer to:

Lord Aubrey Beauclerk (c. 1710–1741), Royal Navy officer
Aubrey Beauclerk, 5th Duke of St Albans (1740–1802), British peer
Aubrey Beauclerk, 6th Duke of St Albans (1765–1815), British peer
Aubrey Beauclerk, 7th Duke of St Albans (1815–1816), British peer
Aubrey Beauclerk (politician) (1801–1854), British politician
Aubrey Beauclerk (cricketer) (1817–1853), English cricketer